The 1853 Atlantic hurricane season featured eight known tropical cyclones, none of which made landfall. Operationally, a ninth tropical storm was believed to have existed over the Dominican Republic on November 26, but HURDAT – the official Atlantic hurricane database – now excludes this system. The first system, Tropical Storm One, was initially observed on August 5. The final storm, Hurricane Eight, was last observed on October 22. These dates fall within the period with the most tropical cyclone activity in the Atlantic. At two points during the season, pairs of tropical cyclones existed simultaneously. Four of the cyclones only have a single known point in their tracks due to a sparsity of data, so storm summaries for those systems are unavailable.

Of the season's eight tropical cyclones, four reached hurricane status. Furthermore, two of those four strengthened into major hurricanes, which are Category 3 or higher on the modern-day Saffir–Simpson hurricane wind scale. The strongest cyclone of the season, the third hurricane, peaked at Category 4 strength with 150 mph (240 km/h) winds. The hurricane caused 40 fatalities after a brig went missing off the coast of North Carolina. Despite remaining offshore, Tropical Storm Five brought very strong winds to the Mexican city of Veracruz. Hurricane Eight brought strong winds and rough seas to North Florida and Georgia, causing significant damage in the latter.


Timeline

Systems

Tropical Storm One

This system would later be listed in HURDAT records as Tropical Storm One. However, due to heavy prevailing weather, further data on this storm is unavailable.

Tropical Storm Two

A publication by meteorologist Ivan R. Tannehill indicates that Tropical Storm Two was centered near Barbados on August 10. However, due its weak nature – maximum sustained winds were only 45 mph (75 km/h) – only a single data point is known of the storm's path.

Hurricane Three 

Meteorologist William C. Redfield first observed the season's third tropical storm south of Cape Verde on August 30, which was the first Cape Verde-type hurricane ever recorded. Initially, the storm moved west-northwestward and gradually strengthened, becoming a hurricane on September 1. Over the next two days, the hurricane intensified significantly and reached Category 2 strength early on September 2. The Great Havana Hurricane of 1846 may have been stronger, though it is discounted because HURDAT records did not begin until the 1851 season.

By September 5, the hurricane curved toward the northwest and began to weaken. The hurricane passed offshore North Carolina later that day, and its outer rainbands produced heavy rainfall along the state's southern coastlines. The brig Albermarle was lost at sea on September 7 with 40 of its crewmen missing; they were later presumed to have drowned. The hurricane recurved east-northeastward and continued to deteriorate steadily, weakening to Category 1 status by September 9.

Hurricane Four 

Sustained winds were initially observed to have reached 115 mph (185 km/h), indicative of a Category 3 hurricane. Several other ships reportedly encountered this storm as it tracked northeastward. With winds decreasing to 105 mph (165 km/h), it weakened to a Category 2 hurricane on September 10.

Tropical Storm Five

Tropical Storm Five was reported to have existed on September 21 at 20°N, 95°W, which is located in the Bay of Campeche. The Elize and Crichton encountered a heavy "norther" upon arriving at Veracruz, Veracruz on that day. Although it was centered offshore, very strong winds were reported in Veracruz, possibly induced by the funneling effect from the Sierra Madre Oriental. Further information of this tropical storm is sparse.

Hurricane Six 

The sixth hurricane of the season was first observed as a tropical storm to the southeast of Bermuda on September 26. Initially, the storm headed north-northwestward, before curving north-northeastward on September 27, while bypassing Bermuda. Later that day, the storm strengthened into a hurricane. The brig Samuel and Edward encountered the hurricane on September 2, reporting winds of 80 mph (130 km/h); this was the maximum sustained wind speed associated with the storm. Thereafter, the storm executed a cyclonic loop, which lasted until September 30.

Tropical Storm Seven

Two separate reports by meteorologists Ivan R. Tannehill and Edward B. Garriott indicate that the seventh tropical storm of the season existed at 15°N, 37°W on September 28, which is located west of Cape Verde. Observations noted that maximum sustained winds reached 60 mph (95 km/h). With only a single data point, no further information is available on this storm.

Hurricane Eight 

Several other ships encountered the storm between October 19 and October 20. It moved slowly north-northwestward and gradually strengthened. On October 20, the storm reached maximum sustained winds of 105 mph (165 km/h), making it a Category 2 hurricane. After weakening back to a Category 1 hurricane on October 21, the storm veered east-northeastward, avoiding a landfall in the Southeastern United States.

Strong winds, combined with tides in Jacksonville, Florida, pushed water over wharfs and onto Bay Street. William Gaston Captain Thomas E. Shaw reported that the gale at Brunswick, Georgia caused significant damage to the town. An engine-house belonging to the Brunswick Railroad Company was flattened, as was a large cotton shed, a blacksmith shop, and a new frame house, and a number of other buildings were damaged. The new railroad wharf was washed away and its remains were floating in the harbor. Offshore, there were numerous shipwrecks, including the schooners W. Mercer, G. W. Pickering, Mary Ann, and the Steamer Planter. Additionally, the schooner James House reported "a perfect hurricane".

See also 

 Atlantic hurricane season
 List of Atlantic hurricanes

References 

 
Atlantic hurricane seasons
Articles which contain graphical timelines
1853 meteorology
1853 natural disasters